Stockton Racecourse (September 1855 - 16 June 1981), also known as Teesside Park, was a British horse racing venue near Stockton-on-Tees in the north east of England, once considered "the finest in the north". Although named "Stockton Racecourse" there has never been a racecourse within Stockton-on-Tees, these courses were actually located across the River Tees in the North Riding of Yorkshire". Pre 1830s an alteration called the Mandale Cut of the river Tees was made. This caused the land of the racecourse north of the Tees (County Durham) to therefore became North Yorkshire. Due to the memory of the land being north of the Tees when the course was named it became Stockton Racecourse.

Through the years, racing took place at three sites in Stockton.  The first of these was The Carrs, where racing first took place in 1724.  Racing was then discontinued in Stockton for many years, before being revived in September 1855 at Mandale Marshes, situated on a loop in the River Tees.  The Mandale course had two stands - the Stewards Stand and the Grand Stand. In three days racing in 1864, the attendance was 36,000

Stockton hosted only flat racing until the opening of the national hunt course in 1967, which was 38 yards wide and cost about £40,000. The flat course was a left-handed oval, slightly under 1 mile 6 furlongs round, with easy turns and a home straight of  4 furlongs. The starts for 5 furlong and 6 furlong races were on separate spurs. The national hunt course was just over 1 mile 4 furlongs, with 9 fences.

At one time, local factories closed down especially for race week.  However, the course went into decline after World War II, losing out to the competing attractions of cinema and TV.  It finally closed on 16 June 1981 due to falling attendances.  The last winner was a horse called Suniti.

The site is now a shopping centre called Teesside Park.

See also
List of British racecourses

References

Bibliography

Defunct horse racing venues in England
1855 establishments in England
1981 disestablishments in England
Sports venues completed in 1855
Sport in the Borough of Stockton-on-Tees